Barbus stappersii is a species of ray-finned fish in the genus Barbus.

Footnotes 
 

S
Fish described in 1915